Gerald Edwards (April 2, 1925 – March 21, 2010) was an American football, basketball, and a track and field coach. He served as the head football coach at Montclair State University Upper Montclair, New Jersey from 1960 to 1965, compiling a record of 36–12. Edwards also coached Montclair State's track and field and junior varsity basketball teams. He died in 2010 after a short illness.

Head coaching record

References

1925 births
2010 deaths
Montclair State Red Hawks football coaches
Montclair State Red Hawks men's basketball coaches
College track and field coaches in the United States
People from Long Island